The Men's 100 metre backstroke S10 event at the 2020 Paralympic Games took place on 2 September 2021, at the Tokyo Aquatics Centre.

Heats

The swimmers with the top eight times, regardless of heat, advanced to the final.

Final

References

Swimming at the 2020 Summer Paralympics